Kate Anthony (born 11 April 1964) is an English actress best known for her role as Pam Hobsworth on the ITV soap Coronation Street.

Career 
She has appeared in Doctors playing Ellen Murray, Sparkhouse playing Jenny Bullock, Casualty playing Angela Phillips and As Time Goes By. More recently she has appeared in Totally Frank, Heartbeat and EastEnders playing Annie Grey. She played the role of Pam Hobsworth in the ITV soap Coronation Street from July 2008 to December 2010. She also had a small role in My Parents Are Aliens as the Inspector Mrs. Morris.

She has had numerous theatrical roles including The Cherry Orchard with Judi Dench and prior to taking the role in Coronation Street, she toured Scotland in The Odd Couple with her closest friend Gerard Kelly.

Anthony starred in Northern Broadsides' production of Rutherford and Son with Barrie Rutter, West Yorkshire Playhouse's Alan Bennett production of Untold Stories and the main role in Sheffield Theatres' production of Queen Coal.

In 2015 Anthony appeared as Ethel Davies in the BBC TV series Father Brown episode 3.14 "The Deadly Seal".

In 2016, she portrayed a Braavosi woman in the HBO series Game of Thrones in Season 6.

She starred in the UK and Irish touring production of Anything Goes as Evangeline Harcourt and then once again toured in the Northern Broadsides hit When We Are Married, as Clara Soppitt, which was directed by and starred Barrie Rutter.

Anthony has also recently been in the comedy series Boomers and is regularly on BBC Radio 4 in Tom Wrigglesworth's Hang Ups, playing Tom's mother.

In 2018 she appeared at the Royal Exchange, Manchester in Queens of The Coal Age, written by Maxine Peake.

In November 2021 she appeared as Hazel in Emmerdale as Andrea Tate's mother, to take legal guardianship of Jamie and Andrea's daughter Millie.

Personal life 
Anthony studied drama at the Webber Douglas Academy of Dramatic Art.

Anthony is married to former actor and racing driver Gary Barak, who is now better known as an automotive & motorsport PR man. They have two children.

Filmography

Television

References

External links

English television actresses
English soap opera actresses
Living people
1964 births
Actresses from Leeds